The Medija Thermal Spa is a spa located in the town of Izlake in central Slovenia. It was established in 1877 by the local businessman Alojz Prašnikar, although thermal baths at the location were already mentioned by Johann Weikhard von Valvasor in his The Glory of the Duchy of Carniola in the 17th century. In the second half of the 20th century, the complex has gradually been expanded: today's spa consists of a hotel, an indoor swimming pool and an outdoor swimming pool complex.

Since 2009, both the hotel and the outdoor swimming pool complex are closed and have been subject to rapid deterioration, caused by a lack of maintenance and vandalism, as well as weather-caused damage, mainly flooding in 2010. In 2013, a civil initiative started a clean-up and restoration of the outdoor pool complex with the purpose of opening it for the local community. A series of clean-ups was organized mainly on Saturdays as well as a photographic exhibition, showing the history of the spa.

Spas
Resorts in Slovenia
Municipality of Zagorje ob Savi